The 732nd Operations Group (732 OG) is an active unit of the United States Air Force, assigned to Air Combat Command's 432nd Wing. Stationed at Creech Air Force Base, Nevada, the unit operates MQ-9 Reaper drones. The unit was first activated on 10 September 2012 and initially contained four reconnaissance squadrons, operating the MQ-1 Predator as well as the MQ-9 Reaper. The group's Detachment 1, operating since at least February 2013, was notable for operating the RQ-170 Sentinel, a stealth unmanned aerial vehicle. In 2015, the detachment was absorbed into the newly activated 44th Reconnaissance Squadron.

Lineage
 Established as 732nd Operations Group on 9 August 2012
 Activated on 10 September 2012

Assignments
 432nd Wing, 10 September 2012 – present

Components
 15th Attack Squadron, unknown–present
 17th Reconnaissance Squadron (later, 17th Attack Squadron), 10 September 2012 – present
 22nd Reconnaissance Squadron (later, 22nd Attack Squadron), 10 September 2012 – present
 30th Reconnaissance Squadron, 10 September 2012 – unknown
 44th Reconnaissance Squadron, 1 April 2015 – unknown
 732nd Operations Support Squadron,  23 January 2019 – present
 867th Reconnaissance Squadron (later, 867th Attack Squadron), 10 September 2012 – present

Stations
 Creech Air Force Base, Nevada, 10 September 2012 – present

Aircraft
 MQ-1 Predator (2012–unknown)
 MQ-9 Reaper (2012–present)
 RQ-170 Sentinel (2015–unknown)

References
Footnotes

Citations

Military units and formations established in 2012
Operations groups of the United States Air Force
2012 establishments in Nevada